Tony Green is the current president of Athletics Papua New Guinea. He was re-elected to the position in 2009. Green is also the senior vice president of Papua New Guinea Olympic Committee (PNGOC).

References

Sport in Papua New Guinea
Athletics (track and field) administrators
Living people
Year of birth missing (living people)